Yellowhead Township is one of seventeen townships in Kankakee County, Illinois, USA.  As of the 2010 census, its population was 2,700 and it contained 1,065 housing units.  Yellowhead Township derives its name from the Potawatomi warrior, Yellow Head, whose village was located at what is now Yellowhead Point.

Geography

Cities, towns, villages
 Grant Park

Unincorporated towns
 Puder at 
 Sherburnville at 
 Sollitt at 
(This list is based on USGS data and may include former settlements.)

Extinct towns
 Judson at 
(These towns are listed as "historical" by the USGS.)

Adjacent townships
 Washington Township, Will County (north)
 West Creek Township, Lake County, Indiana (east)
 Momence Township (south)
 Ganeer Township (southwest)
 Sumner Township (west)

Cemeteries
The township contains these three cemeteries: Saint Paul Lutheran, Scherburnville Christian and Union Corner.

Major highways
  Illinois Route 1

Airports and landing strips
 Love Field
 Mussman Airport

Demographics

Government
The township is governed by an elected Town Board of a supervisor and four trustees.  The township also has an elected assessor, clerk, highway commissioner and supervisor.  The township office is located at 7090 North Bull Creek Road, Grant Park, IL 60940.

Political districts
 Illinois's 11th congressional district
 State House District 79
 State Senate District 40

School districts
 Grant Park Community Unit School District 6

References
 
 United States Census Bureau 2007 TIGER/Line Shapefiles
 United States National Atlas

External links
 Kankankee County Official Site
 City-Data.com
 Illinois State Archives

Townships in Kankakee County, Illinois
Populated places established in 1853
Townships in Illinois